Pradipta Kumar Naik (born 14 June 1966) is an Indian politician.He won the Vidhan sabha seat of Bhawanipatna Odisha four times with two times as Minister in Odisha. He became a Member of the Legislative Assembly in 1995 at the very young age of 27. He was elected to the Odisha Legislative Assembly from Bhawanipatna in the 2019 Odisha Legislative Assembly election as a member of the BJP. He is Leader of Opposition in Odisha Legislative Assembly.'''

References

1966 births
Living people
Bharatiya Janata Party politicians from Odisha
People from Bhawanipatna
Odisha MLAs 2019–2024
Sambalpur University alumni